Hypsopygia mauritialis is a moth of the family Pyralidae described by Jean Baptiste Boisduval in 1833. It is a widespread species, known from Africa, India, China, Malaysia, Taiwan, Japan, Australia and Hawaii.

The wingspan is 16–21 mm.

The larvae feed in the old nests of Vespinae wasps, including Polistes species.

External links

Japanese Moths

Moths described in 1833
Pyralini
Moths of Madagascar
Lepidoptera of Uganda
Moths of Japan
Moths of Mauritius
Lepidoptera of Zambia
Lepidoptera of Zimbabwe
Moths of Réunion
Moths of Sub-Saharan Africa